Clyde Williams (October 13, 1873 – November 12, 1954) was a U.S. Representative from Missouri.

Born on a farm near Grubville, Missouri, Williams attended the county schools, De Soto High School, and the State normal school at Cape Girardeau.
He was graduated from the law department of the University of Missouri in 1901.
He was admitted to the bar the same year and commenced practice in De Soto, Missouri.
He served as prosecuting attorney of Jefferson County in 1902–1908.

Williams was elected as a Democrat to the Seventieth Congress (March 4, 1927 – March 3, 1929).
He was an unsuccessful candidate for reelection in 1928 to the Seventy-first Congress.
He resumed the practice of law.

Williams was elected to the Seventy-second and to the five succeeding Congresses (March 4, 1931 – January 3, 1943).
He was an unsuccessful candidate for reelection in 1942 to the Seventy-eighth Congress.
He engaged in legal work for the Reconstruction Finance Corporation in Washington, D.C. from 1943 to 1945.
He served as president of the Jefferson Trust Co. in Hillsboro and president of the Bank of Hillsboro.
He died in St. Louis, Missouri, November 12, 1954.
He was interred in Hillsboro Cemetery, Hillsboro, Missouri.

References

1873 births
1954 deaths
20th-century American politicians
University of Missouri School of Law alumni
Democratic Party members of the United States House of Representatives from Missouri
Missouri lawyers
People from Jefferson County, Missouri
People from De Soto, Missouri